Aveleda e Rio de Onor is a civil parish in the municipality of Bragança, Portugal. It was formed in 2013 by the merger of the former parishes Aveleda and Rio de Onor. The population in 2011 was 272, in an area of 106.35 km².

Language
Portuguese is spoken by everyone. Historically the main language was Rionorese, an Astur-Leonese language, which almost extinct today.

References

Parishes of Bragança, Portugal